Idyllwild Arts Academy is a private school located in Idyllwild, in the San Jacinto Mountains and San Bernardino National Forest, within western Riverside County, California. The school was founded in 1946. It was previously known as Idyllwild School of Music and the Arts.

About 
It offers a college preparatory program for grades 9–12 and post-graduates, with training in music, theater, dance, visual art, creative writing, film, and interdisciplinary arts. An audition or portfolio is required for admission.

The academy is accredited by the Western Association of Schools and Colleges (WASC).

It was the first independent boarding high school for the arts in the western United States.

Idyllwild Arts Academy offers programs including music, visual arts, theatre, creative writing, dance, fashion design, film & digital media, and interdisciplinary arts. Outside of regular school year, Idyllwild Arts Academy offers summer workshops that include Jazz in the Pines, ESL, Native American Arts.

Notable alumni

Joel Gennari, Artist. Emmy Award-winning puppet builder for The Jim Henson Company. Book illustrator for Soman Chainani, Victoria Aveyard, & Harper Collins
Casey Abrams, American Idol season 10 contestant and musician
Clayton Alexander, inventor.
Amanda Aday, actress.
Neal Bledsoe, actor on Smash and Ugly Betty. 
 Douwe Blumberg, sculptor.
Evan Christopher, clarinetist.
Shepard Fairey, artist.
Greer Grammer, actress 
Trevor Hall, musician. 
Celeste Headlee, author and radio host 
Marin Ireland, actress 
Aaron Lee Tasjan, musician.
Nate Lowman, artist.
Jennifer Missoni, actress.
Michael Tilson Thomas, conductor and pianist 
Liang Wang, oboeist
Mara Wilson, actress.

Notable faculty 

Lisa Adams, painter
Suzanne Jackson, visual artist and dancer
Michael Kabotie, Hopi silversmith
Bella Lewitzky, Modern dancer and founding chair of the Dance Department at Idyllwild Arts Academy (1956–1972).
Mary Stone McLendon, Chickasaw artist and educator.
Eleonore Schoenfeld, cellist and longtime professor at University of Southern California (USC) at the Thornton School of Music.

In popular culture
In the television series The Fosters the character Brandon Foster attends a summer program in piano competition at Idyllwild.

Author Justin Cronin confirmed on Twitter that Idyllwild Arts Academy eventually becomes the community called First Colony in his book The Passage as humanity tries to survive one hundred years into a vampire apocalypse.

References

External links

The Association of Boarding Schools profile

High schools in Riverside County, California
Art schools in California
Music schools in California
Private high schools in California
Preparatory schools in California
San Jacinto Mountains
Educational institutions established in 1986
1986 establishments in California
Schools of the performing arts in the United States
Boarding schools in California